Rukban, sometimes transliterated Rakban, Arabic (الرُّكبان) or (الرُّقبان) is an arid remote area on the Syrian border near the extreme northeast of Jordan, close to the joint borders with Syria and Iraq.

The area became a refugee camp for Syrians in 2014. It lies along the demilitarized berm between Jordan and Syria, a no man's land. The camp is also located within the 55 kilometer "de-confliction zone" garrisoned by the U.S. and the Syrian Free Army rebel group.

Syrian Civil War spillover

Rukban is a completely arid remote area that became inhabited by a number of Syrian refugees in 2014. Until 2016, Jordan used to welcome refugees from several crossings that exist along the border with Syria, and the country has welcomed over 1.4 million Syrians by 2016. This specific border point became inhabited by asylum seekers as Jordan had blocked their access, however, it allows around 50 to a 100 of them to pass into the country after strict screening; the government cited security concerns regarding intel on the presence of hidden ISIL sleeper cells. Jordan says that the refugees in this area have arrived mostly from Islamic State controlled territories such as Raqqa, and that ISIL sleeper cells infiltrated these refugees. The UN accepted that the number of refugees that Jordan is hosting gives rise to legitimate security concerns (as with any country hosting large numbers of refugees). The UN did not concede that Rukban residents presented any specific or additional security concern, but the organization called on Jordan to immediately allow refugees in Rukban to access the country.  Melessa Flemming of UNHCR said: "UN officials accept Jordan has legitimate security concerns, but the UN continues to urge Jordan to permit residents of Rukban to enter Jordan.", UNHCR). The number of Syrians there rose to 75,000 in 2016, becoming a de facto camp, which drew heavy criticism and condemnation to Jordan from Human Rights Watch (HRW) in 2015.

At dawn on 21 June 2016, according to the Jordanian military, a car crossed over from Rukban on Syrian territory and managed to reach a Jordanian army outpost designated for the distribution of humanitarian aid to refugees. The car exploded, killing 6 and injuring 14 Jordanian soldiers.

Jordanian minister of foreign affairs Nasser Judeh said in a press conference "we don't need a hideous terrorist attack like this one to prove to the world the legitimacy of our security concerns". He added "we will not put the lives of our soldiers and our country at risk because this is not Jordan's problem alone, this is an international responsibility", "Jordan has provided for refugees what no other country has, with regard to its resources. We will not allow anyone to take the higher moral ground". Jordan afterwards declared its northern and eastern borders closed military areas, and stressed that the armed forces' border guards will not tolerate any uncoordinated movements approaching its borders and that force will be decisively used against it.

Despite this, HRW continued to condemn Jordan, most recently on 7 September 2016, due to deteriorating life conditions in Rukban after humanitarian aid was halted due to fears from further terror attacks against the Jordanian army and international humanitarian aid agencies.

During Angelina Jolie's visit to Syrian refugee camps in Jordan on 9 September 2016, she made the following statement during a press conference: "This is not a problem of Jordan's making, or that Jordan should be left to bear alone. Jordan has been warning for years that they could reach a point where they on their own could do no more. The world has known about the situation on the berm for months but no solution has been put forward."

Another attack happened on 17 December 2016, 3 km north of the border in Syria. The bombing targeted a warehouse while it was distributing clothes to refugees, resulting in 2 dead and 15 injured Syrians. On 21 January 2017, according to the Syrian Observatory for Human Rights, a third explosion went off in the camp by a car bomb. 4 Syrians were killed and 14 were injured, the injured were evacuated by the Jordanian army into a medical facility.

A Jordanian military source said a car bomb exploded in the market area of the camp on 3 May 2017, killing four Syrians and injuring others. Jordan began blocking aid deliveries to the camp from early 2018.

On 23 August 2018, Russian spokeswoman Maria Zakharova claimed that hundreds of ISIL and Jabhat al-Nusra members were hiding among the refugees inside the camp, using them as human shields, with the knowledge of the U.S. military at Al-Tanf. In September 2016 Alice Wells, the then-U.S. Ambassador to Jordan, made the claim that the refugee camp housed a variety of different people possibly including armed groups and terrorists. However, the prevalence of IS fighters in the camp is disputed by the camp's civilian Shura governing council.

In October 2018, UNICEF estimated that 45,000 people live at the camp. Other estimates are of 50,000 or even 70,000. In October, relief workers and refugees said the Syrian army blockaded the roads and prevented aid from reaching the camp, in an attempt to force frightened refugees into reconciliation. Western sources say it was part of a Russian backed effort to pressure US and rebel forces to leave their base at nearby al-Tanf, while a Russian military source blamed the United States as responsible for security in the area. UNICEF reported that two infants died in the camp in early October, and called for urgent action, and one local NGO reported 14 civilians had died from late September to 10 October.

In January 2019, eight children were reported to have died at the Rukban camp due to cold weather and inadequate medical care, with the total number of refugees at the camp estimated at 45,000, 80% women and children. Rukban received its first aid delivery in three months on 7 February 2019 with the United Nations and the Syrian Arab Red Crescent reaching the camp with 118 trucks packed with food supplies, basic medicines, education items and children's recreational kits. Aid workers had arrived on the night of 6 February after arduous negotiations with the Syrian government. The aid convoy was expected to spend a week distributing material to the camp's residents.

In April 2019, UNOCHA estimated that 36,000 people were still living in the camp, and that 7,000 had left "in the last month or so."
As of 23 May, 13,153 people in 16 groups have left Rukban and been transported to five shelters in Homs governorate; constituting more than a third of Rukban's population of nearly 42,000.

In July 2019 one estimate suggests the camp had dwindled to a population of 11,000. Aid workers, diplomats and residents say it was a result of a five month Russian siege to block supplies.

As of March 2020 the area suffers in a food crisis and humanitarian disaster. The Syrian government continues to block almost all aid, with no more than four aid convoys over the prior two years. Residents say they fear violence or forcible military conscription by the Syrian regime if they leave.

See also
 Syrian refugee camps

References

Syrian refugee camps